Provo is a Serbian village located in the Vladimirci municipality of the Mačva District, with an altitude of 86 meters. As of 2002 the population of Provo is 2,355.

External links
Google Maps photograph
  

Populated places in Mačva District